Vince Eager (born Roy Taylor, 4 June 1940) is an English pop singer. He was widely promoted by impresario Larry Parnes, but later quarrelled with him over his commercialising of Eddie Cochran's tragic early death. Eager has since appeared in cabaret and on the West End stage.

Early life and career

Eager was born in Grantham, Lincolnshire. As a teenager, he formed the Harmonica Vagabonds, later the Vagabonds Skiffle Group, with Roy Clark, Mick Fretwell, and bassist Brian Locking. The group reached the final round of a televised "World Skiffle Championship" in 1958, and were offered a residency at the 2 I's Coffee Bar in London.  There, they were signed by impresario Larry Parnes, who took Taylor into his stable of performers, and gave him one of his characteristic stage names, Vince Eager.  After touring and releasing an EP as Vince Eager & the Vagabonds, Clark and Fretwell returned home. Vince Eager and Brian Locking remained in London, Locking performing with Marty Wilde before joining the Shadows.

Larry Parnes era
During 1959, Vince Eager was a regular on BBC TV's Drumbeat, often accompanied by the John Barry Seven. In 1960 he was one of the contestants on A Song for Europe. In the semi-final, his song, "Teenage Tears", was ranked last out of six entries for nomination to the Eurovision Song Contest. According to Vince Eager's website, "the death of his best friend Eddie Cochran in a car crash on Easter Sunday 1960 was to prove a turning point in Vince's career. He was disgusted with the manner in which Parnes sought to gain publicity from the accident and he began the process of getting away from the "Parnes Stable" of popsters".

Later career
In the years that followed the Parnes era, he toured on the cabaret circuit, and performed in theatre and pantomime. For five years he starred in the West End musical Elvis. In 1986, he moved to Fort Lauderdale, Florida, United States, where he worked as a cruise director on American luxury cruise ships.

Now residing back in the UK, Eager's career has had something of a resurgence. Teaming up with producer and musician Alan Wilson, there have been new recordings some of which have featured Eager's old friends including; Marty Wilde, Albert Lee and Chas Hodges. The resulting album release, titled 788 years of Rock n Roll sold well enough for Wilson's Western Star record label to invite Eager back for another session in 2013. The latest album, Rockabilly Dinosaur was released in 2014. Eager now lives in Nottinghamshire.

In 2018, he featured on the track "Halfway to Paradise" on the newly released Billy Fury album The Symphonic Sound of Fury.

Discography

Singles
 "Five Days" b/w "No More", Parlophone, 1958
 "Railroad Song" b/w "When Is Your Birthday Baby", Parlophone, 1958
 "No Other Arms No Other Lips" b/w "This Should Go on Forever", Parlophone, 1958
 "I Wanna Love My Life Away" b/w "I Know What I Want", Top Rank, 1961
 "Why" b/w "El Paso", Top Rank, 1959
 "The World's Loneliest Man" b/w "Created in a Dream", Top Rank, 1960
 "Makin' Love" b/w "Primrose Lane", Top Rank, 1960
 "Lonely Blue Boy" b/w "No Love Have I", Top Rank, 1961
 "Anytime Is The Right Time" b/w "Heavenly", Pye, 1963
 "I Shall Not Be Moved" b/w "It's Only Make Believe", Pye, 1963

Extended plays
 Vince Eager & The Vagabonds: Soda Pop Pop: "Yea Yea" b/w "Lend Me Your Comb", "Tread Softly Stranger", "Gumdrop", Decca, 1958
 Vince Eager & The Vagabonds: Hound Dog: "Money Honey", "Be Bop A Lu La", "Cotton Fields", "My Dixie Darling", Rollercoaster, 2000

Studio albums
 Vince Eager Pays Tribute To Elvis, Avenue, 1971
 20 Years On, Nevis, 1977
 788 Years of Rock and Roll, Western Star Records, 2011
 Rockabilly Dinosaur, Western Star Records, 2014
 75 Not Out, Western Star Records, 2015

Live albums
 Raised on Rock, Charley Farley, 2001

Compilation albums
 Oh Boy, Parlophone, 1958 (various artists; Vince Eager: "Buzz Buzz Buzz" and Blue Ribbon Baby)
 Drumbeat, Parlophone, 1959 (various artists; Vince Eager: It's Late, This Should Go On Forever and It Doesn't Matter Anymore)
 British Rock 'n' Roll 1955–1960, See For Miles, 1986 (various artists – two songs by Vince Eager)
 Without You – The Songs of Billy Fury, Peaksoft, 2002 (one song by Vince Eager & Big Jim Sullivan)
 Yea Yea! It's Vince Eager!, Rollercoaster Records, 2003
 The Complete Vince Eager, Pink 'n' Black Records, 2007
 The Top Rank Story 1959, One Day Music, 2012 (various artists – one song by Vince Eager)
 The Top Rank Story 1961, One Day Music, 2012 (various artists – one song by Vince Eager)

References

External links
 Vince Eager – a pioneer of British pop – Official website
 Vince Eager at All Music
 Vince Eager at Rate Your Music
 Video clips
 Author of new Billy Fury book visits The Cavern 1 December 2007 by David Charters, Liverpool Daily Post
 Vince Eager visiting Radio Caroline on 27 November 2007

People from Grantham
1940 births
Living people
English pop singers
English male singers
Decca Records artists
Parlophone artists
Top Rank Records artists
Pye Records artists
British rock and roll musicians